Blessed is the debut album by Lebanese-German singer Fady Maalouf. It was released by Columbia Records and Sony BMG on 25 July 2008 in German-speaking Europe, following his participation in the fifth season of Deutschland sucht den Superstar, the German version of Pop Idol, where he had finished second. Maalouf worked with German producer Alex Christensen on the entire album, while musician such as Jörgen Elofsson, Andrew Love, Peer Astrom, Per Eklund, Lauren Evans, Mike Busbee, and Maalouf himself received songwriting credits on Blessed.

The album received mixed reviews from critics, with laut.de praising Maaloufs's vocals but criticizing the Christensen's production on the songs. A major commercial success, 
Blessed became one of the biggest-charting albums of any DSDS runner-up, debuting and peaking at number two on the German Albums Chart, while reaching number seven in Austria and Germany. Its release was preceded by the same-titled lead single, which became a number two hit on the German Singles Chart. A reissue of Blessed, containing several new recordings, was released in November 2008.

Track listing 
Credits adapted from the liner notes of Blessed.

Charts

Weekly charts

Year-end charts

References

2008 debut albums
Fady Maalouf albums